Delia Memorial School (Yuet Wah)  is a secondary school founded in 1975 located in Kwun Tong District, Hong Kong.

Facilities
Computer rooms
Multi-Media Learning Centre (MMLC)
Swimming Pool
Chemistry Laboratory
Physics Laboratory
Science Laboratory
Basketball Court
Badminton Courts
Stadium
Gymnastic room
Hall

See also
 Delia School of Canada, Hong Kong

External links

Delia Memorial School (YW)

Educational institutions established in 1975
Kwun Tong District
Secondary schools in Hong Kong
Delia Group of Schools